McSherrystown is a borough in Adams County, Pennsylvania, United States. The population was 3,077 as of the 2020 census.

McSherrystown was home to the headquarters of Teddy Bear manufacturer Boyds Bears, as well as the oldest operating family-run cigar manufacturer in the U.S. (since 1863), F.X. Smith & Sons. Boyds has since closed down, and in 2018, the cigar company was sold.

History
McSherrystown is the fourth oldest town in Adams County. Its founder, Patrick McSherry (1725–1795) having family origins stemming from Newry, Northern Ireland, procured a  tract from the Digges Family in 1763 and proceeded to lay out a number of  lots. The first known deed for one of these lots was dated June 27, 1765. Although McSherry may have intended his effort to be used primarily as outlots for Hanover residents, where they could keep their animals at times and obtain wood, it soon developed into a full-fledged town. McSherry, who lived in Mount Pleasant Township in 1765 and was later tavern-keeper in Littlestown, may never have lived in the town which bears his name.

Geography
McSherrystown is located at  (39.804202, -77.019301).

Demographics

As of the census of 2000, there were 2,691 people, 1,175 households, and 727 families residing in the borough. The population density was 5,138.7 people per square mile (1,998.1/km²). There were 1,231 housing units at an average density of 2,350.7 per square mile (914.0/km²). The racial makeup of the borough was 97.88% White, 0.52% African American, 0.22% Native American, 0.19% Asian, 0.04% Pacific Islander, 0.30% from other races, and 0.85% from two or more races. Hispanic or Latino of any race were 1.64% of the population.

There were 1,175 households, out of which 29.0% had children under the age of 18 living with them, 45.7% were married couples living together, 11.7% had a female householder with no husband present, and 38.1% were non-families. 32.0% of all households were made up of individuals, and 15.4% had someone living alone who was 65 years of age or older. The average household size was 2.27 and the average family size was 2.86.

In the borough the population was spread out, with 22.3% under the age of 18, 8.1% from 18 to 24, 31.0% from 25 to 44, 20.4% from 45 to 64, and 18.2% who were 65 years of age or older. The median age was 37 years. For every 100 females there were 86.6 males. For every 100 females age 18 and over, there were 82.4 males.

The median income for a household in the borough was $32,286, and the median income for a family was $40,089. Males had a median income of $33,378 versus $20,784 for females. The per capita income for the borough was $20,158. About 1.4% of families and 6.0% of the population were below the poverty line, including 3.2% of those under age 18 and 6.5% of those age 65 or over.

References

External links

Populated places established in 1765
Boroughs in Adams County, Pennsylvania
1882 establishments in Pennsylvania